The Road is the eleventh Korean-language studio album (fourteenth overall) by South Korean boy band Super Junior set to be released on January 6, 2023. The album was originally released in two parts, The Road: Keep On Going and The Road: Celebration. The former was released on July 12, 2022, while the latter was released on December 15, 2022, by SM Entertainment. The album features the vocals of nine Super Junior members, which are Leeteuk, Heechul, Yesung, Shindong, Eunhyuk, Donghae, Siwon, Ryeowook and Kyuhyun.

Background 
On June 13, 2022, Label SJ released the concept trailer for their eleventh album.

On June 28, 2022, Super Junior released the track list for Vol.1 of their eleventh album. Five tracks were included in Vol.1. The title song for the album was "Mango".

Super Junior released the music video for their second track, "Don't Wait", on June 29, 2022.

On November 28, SM released the first set of teasers for The Road Vol. 2: Celebration, with a set release date of December 16.

Promotion

Super Show 9 
On July 15 to July 17, the group embarked on the album supporting tour, Super Show 9 at the Jamsil Arena in Seoul. They first performed "Celebrate" during the Philippines stop of the tour on December 17, 2022.

Track listing

Charts

Weekly charts

Monthly charts

Year-end charts

References 

SM Entertainment albums
Super Junior albums
2022 albums
Korean-language albums